Jorge Luis Flores Sánchez (born February 22, 1974), better known as Nina Flowers, is a Puerto Rican drag queen, DJ, activist, professional make-up artist, and reality television personality who has been performing since 1993. He is best known for being the runner-up of the inaugural season of RuPaul's Drag Race, as well as being a contestant on the first season of RuPaul's Drag Race: All Stars.

Biography 
Flowers was born and raised in Puerto Rico. He started his career as a DJ in 1989 where she became a resident DJ at Krash Klub Kafe, one of the most prestigious clubs in the Caribbean. He started his drag career in March 1993 while studying to become a professional makeup artist. In 1999, she won both the Miss Puerto Rico Continental and Miss City Lights Continental pageants. His drag name originates from a combination of the names Nina Hagen, who was his favorite rockstar, and his last name, Flores, which translates to flowers in English.

Television
Flowers became a cast member on Logo's reality series, RuPaul's Drag Race, which premiered on the network in February 2009.  Flowers finished in second place and won the Miss Congeniality award during the first season's reunion special, making him the first runner-up to win the title and highest ever Miss Congeniality in the history of the show. He is also the first ever contestant to win a maxi challenge in the history of the show as well as the first contestant to never place in the bottom two.  The publicity generated by his participation on the show brought many new opportunities to perform at various national and international LGBT events including Denver Pride, San Juan Pride, Chicago Pride and Vancouver Pride. Besides his participation on RuPaul's Drag Race, Flowers (along with season two contestant Jessica Wild) has performed on the popular Puerto Rican television program Objetivo Fama, which airs throughout the United States and Latin America.

In early 2010, Flowers joined the cast of Logo's new reality series RuPaul's Drag U. This summer replacement series premiered on July 19, 2010. Flowers was one of 12 past Drag Race contestants in the season-one cast of RuPaul's Drag Race: All Stars, which premiered on the Logo network on October 22, 2012. Forming Team Brown Flowers along with contestant Tammie Brown, both contestants were eliminated in the second episode of the series which aired on October 28, 2012.

Music

In December 2009, Flowers (in collaboration with DJ Ranny) released his first dance single "Loca", which is available for purchase via iTunes and other commercial music sites. The single has been remixed by such notable remixers as William Umana, Joe Gauthreaux, and Manny Lehman. The single reached its highest spot (#15) on the Billboard Hot Dance Club Play the week of 30 January 2010. Continuing his first successful venture in the dance music industry, Flowers released her first EP of original songs on July 15, 2010.  Titled Start Your Engines, the album is a compilation of six tracks that he and producer/remixer William Umana produced. The first single, "Locas in da House," utilizes Flowers's trademark catchphrase in a tribal house anthem. In January 2011, Flowers released his dance single "I'm Feelin Flowers", which he produced in collaboration with Miami-based deejay/producer DJ MDW. His single "Rock the Beat" was released on July 31, 2012. Today Nina Flowers holds DJ residencies in several cities in the US and he continues to captivate fans around the globe with his powerfully engaging connection to the audiences, and his progressive sound filled with tribal beats.  Nina Flowers describes his sound as edgy, spicy, colorful, energetic, groovy and original.

Personal life
Flowers and his husband, Antonio Purcell resided in Denver, Colorado, as of 2009 to the end of 2020, and moved to Dallas, Texas in December 2020.

On May 29, 2009, Denver's mayor, John Hickenlooper, proclaimed May 29 "Nina Flowers Day" in recognition of Flowers's contributions to the city's LGBT community.

Filmography

Film

Television

Music videos

Web series

Discography
EPs

Singles

References

External links 
 
 
 
Nina Flowers interview on Logo

1974 births
Living people
American dance musicians
American drag queens
Puerto Rican drag queens
American make-up artists
American LGBT musicians
People from Bayamón, Puerto Rico
People from Denver
Nina Flowers
LGBT DJs
Nina Flowers
Hispanic and Latino American drag queens